Saionji (西園寺) is a Japanese family name of former kuge descent. People with the name include:

The Saionji family, kuge family.
Prince Saionji Kinmochi, 12th and 14th Prime Minister of Japan
Empress Saionji, wife of Emperor Go-Fukakusa

Fictional characters
Chiaki Saionji of Demon Ororon
Kaoru Saionji of Gakuen Heaven
Kyoichi Saionji of Revolutionary Girl Utena
Sekai Saionji of School Days 
 Reimi Saionji of Star Ocean: The Last Hope
 Hiyoko Saionji of Danganronpa 2: Goodbye Despair
 Rika Saionji of Yamada-kun and the Seven Witches
 Takato Saionji of Buriki One
 Ukyo Saionji of Dr.Stone
 Enju Saion-ji of Moe! Ninja Girls by NTT Solmare

Japanese-language surnames